John K. Wright (born November 8, 1948) is a former American football coach.  He served as the head football coach at Kentucky State University in 1986, Johnson C. Smith University, in 1991, and Elizabeth City State University from 2000 to 2002; he was also the interim head football coach at Albany State University for the final seven games of the 1981 season following the firing of Willie Williamson.  Wright graduated from Virginia Union University in 1971.  He coached high school football in Orange and Asbury Park, New Jersey before serving as the offensive coordinator at Norfolk State University in 1984 and 1985.

Head coaching record

Notes

References

1948 births
Living people
Albany State Golden Rams football coaches
Elizabeth City State Vikings football coaches
Hampton Pirates football coaches
Johnson C. Smith Golden Bulls football coaches
Kentucky State Thorobreds football coaches
Norfolk State Spartans football coaches
Virginia Union Panthers football coaches
Virginia Union Panthers football players
People from Asbury Park, New Jersey
Sportspeople from Monmouth County, New Jersey
Players of American football from New Jersey